Plitvica refers to

 Plitvica, Slovenia, a village near Apače
 Plitvica (river), a tributary of Drava, in northern Croatia
 Plitvica Selo, a village in Croatia in the Plitvička Jezera municipality
 Plitvica Voćanska, a village in Croatia in the municipality of Donja Voća